|}

The Classic Chase is a Premier Handicap National Hunt steeplechase in Great Britain which is open to horses aged five years or older. It is run at Warwick over a distance of about 3 miles and 5 furlongs (3 miles 5 furlongs and 54 yards, or 5,883 metres), and during its running there are twenty-two fences to be jumped. It is a handicap race, and it is scheduled to take place each year in January.

The present event was introduced in 2004, although a similar race, the Warwick (Brooke Bond Oxo) National Chase, had been previously staged until 2000. As with its predecessor, the Classic Chase is usually contested by several horses which subsequently compete in the Grand National. The 2017 winner, One For Arthur, went on to win the Grand National. It was re-classified as a Premier Handicap from the 2023 running when Grade 3 status was renamed by the British Horseracing Authority.

Winners
 Weights given in stones and pounds.

See also
 Horse racing in Great Britain
 List of British National Hunt races

References

 Racing Post:

 pedigreequery.com – Classic Handicap Chase – Warwick., 
  – "Warwick National Chase" (2000).
 breakingnews.ie – "Warwick abandoned" (2009).
 bbc.co.uk – "Weather prospects for racing" (2010).

National Hunt races in Great Britain
Warwick Racecourse
National Hunt chases
Recurring sporting events established in 2004
2004 establishments in England